| area_rank                = 
| area_total_km2           = 
| elevation_footnotes      = 
| elevation_m              = 
| population_total         = 39244
| population_as_of         = 2011
| population_rank          = 
| population_density_km2   = 38.73
| population_demonym       = 
| population_footnotes     = 
| demographics_type1       = Languages
| demographics1_title1     = Official
| demographics1_info1      = Malayalam, English
| timezone1                = IST
| utc_offset1              = +5:30
| postal_code_type         = Postal code
| postal_code              = 691306
| registration_plate       = KL-25
| website                  = 
| footnotes                = 
| image_map                = https://www.google.com/maps/place/Edamulackal,+Kerala/@8.9069589,76.8710288,11z/data=!4m2!3m1!1s0x3b05de5590cc51b7:0xa0137eb02d7bbd06?hl=en-in
}}

 Edamulackal  is a village and gram panchayat in Kollam district in the state of Kerala, India. Situated near the second fastest growing town of Kerala, Anchal. Ayoor is the main town thats located on the M C Road or state highway One, within the area limits of Edamulackal gram panchayat.

Edamulackal village area, still retaining all the natural and scenic beauty of a typical Kerala village, is developing fast in education and service sectors too. The greeny slightly uneven terrain supports a wide range of agricultural activities, supported by the waters of Ithikkara river.

Demographics
 India census, Edamulackal had a population of 39244 with 18297 males and 20947 females.

References

Villages in Kollam district

2. 2011 Census data from the Official website of Department of Panchayats, Local Self Government Department, Government of Kerala